Zabrus vaulogeri is a species of ground beetle in the Polysitus subgenus that is endemic to Algeria.

References

Beetles described in 1915
Beetles of North Africa
Endemic fauna of Algeria